Abkhaz and Abkhazian may refer to:
 Something of, from, or related to Abkhazia, a de facto independent region with partial recognition as a sovereign state, otherwise recognized as part of Georgia
 Abkhaz people or Abkhazians, persons from Abkhazia or of Abkhaz descent
 Abkhaz language
 Abkhazian culture
 Abkhazian cuisine
 Abkhazi, a princely family in Georgia, a branch of the Anchabadze family from Abkhazia

See also 
 Abasgoi, ancient tribe likely the ancestors of the Abkhazians
 
 

Language and nationality disambiguation pages